Preteen Zenith is an American rock band fronted by Tripping Daisy and The Polyphonic Spree frontman, Tim DeLaughter. They were formed in 2011 and feature ex-members of Tripping Daisy and The Polyphonic Spree. Their second single featured Erykah Badu and was released in March 2012.

Discography

Albums
 Rubble Guts and BB Eye (2012) - Good Records

Singles
 "Breathe" (2011) - Good Records
 "Damage Control" (2012) - Good Records

References

External links
 Official Website - Preteen Zenith
 Good Records Artist Page - Good Records Recordings

Alternative rock groups from Texas
Musical groups established in 2011
Musical groups from Dallas
Grunge musical groups
2011 establishments in Texas